Caradrina montana is a small moth of the family Noctuoidea. It is common to western North America as well as western Asia and Europe. It feeds on alfalfa leaves.

The wingspan is 26–31 mm.

References

External links

Fauna Europaea
Lepiforum.de

Caradrinini
Moths of Europe
Taxa named by Otto Vasilievich Bremer
Moths described in 1861